CCFilms is a Mexican production company that specializes in content for television, motion pictures, advertising, and Internet. Its owners and founders are experienced TV journalists and producers Ruben Carrillo and Laura Corona.

With almost 21 years of presence, CCFilms started as an independent television producer, and is now recognized as one of the most prestigious television production companies in the Spanish-speaking market.

In the last 10 years the company has developed over 5000 stories and segments for TV networks in Mexico and the United States. Discovery Channel, The History Channel, Animal Planet, The Biography Channel, Univision and Telemundo are among their frequent customers.

References 

Film production companies of Mexico